This is a selected list of massively multiplayer online role-playing games (MMORPGs). 

MMORPGs are large multi-user games that take place in perpetual online worlds with a great number of other players. In most MMORPGs each player controls an avatar that interacts with other players, completes tasks to gain experience, and acquires items. MMORPGs use a wide range of business models, from free of charge, free with microtransactions, advertise funded, to various kinds of payment plans. Most early MMORPGs were text-based and web browser-based, later 2D, isometric, side-scrolling and 3D games emerged, including on video game consoles and mobile phones.

See also
List of text-based MMORPGs
List of MMOGs
List of free MMOGs
List of MUDs
List of multiplayer browser games
History of MMORPGs
Online game
Turn-based MMORPG

Notes

MMORPGs
list
Online text-based role-playing games